The Swiss Dance Awards are a distinction created in 2012 by the Swiss Confederation, as a measure to encourage the dance world. Since 2013 the Federal Dance Jury, the prizes are awarded every two years in collaboration with the Federal Office of Culture (FOC).

History

This Award was created as a Federal support to dance, it was introduced as part of the Federal law of encouragement to culture.

It pursues and furthers the objectives of the Swiss Dance and Choreography prize (2002–2011). The [Swiss Confederation] having taken up the prize as recognition and support in its objectives.

The first ceremony of this award took place in the Theatre l'Equilibre in Fribourg in 2013.

Principals

The Swiss Grand Award for Dance pays tribute to an artistic career and is the top prize of 40,000 francs awarded by the Federal Dance Jury. An equal amount is assigned to the Special Dance Award  as a recompense for an exceptional contribution in the fields of mediation, documentation or cultural policy.  As part of the "Current Dance Creation" competition the jury allocates four Swiss Dance Awards  each of 25,000 francs. The June Johnson Prize is given in collaboration with the Stanley Thomas Johnson Foundation and rewards the upcoming dance generation. An Award of 25,000 francs is endowed to Outstanding Female and Male Dancers for their performing role.

Dance Awards Laureates

Swiss Grand Award for Dance    
2019: La Ribot

2017: Noemi Lapzeson

2015: Gilles Jobin

2013: Martin Schläpfer

Swiss Dance Awards 
2019:

 Flow - Compagnie Linga & Keda
 Hate me, tender - Teresa Vittucci
 Speechless Voices - Compagnie Greffe/Cindy Van Acker
 Vicky setzt Segel - Company Mafalda/Teresa Rotemberg

2017:

 Creature-József Trefeli & Gábor Varga
 iFeel3-*MELK Prod./Marco Berrettini
 inaudible-ZOO/Thomas Hauert
 Le Récital des Posture-Yasmine Hugonnet

2015:

 Souffle - DA MOTUS! / Brigitte Meuwly and Antonio Bühler
 Requiem - Tanzcompagnie Konzert Theater Bern / Nanine Linning
 bits C 128Hz - miR Compagnie / Béatrice Goetz
 Orthopädie or to be - Kilian Haselbeck/Meret Schlegel

2013:

 Sideways Rain - Alias Cie / Guilherme Botelho
 From B to B - Thomas Hauert/ZOO et Àngels Margarit/Cia Mudances
 Disabled Theater - Theater HORA / Jérôme Bel
 Diffraction - Cie Greffe / Cindy Van Acker

June Johnson Dance Price 
2019: Unplush / Marion Zurbach

2017: Hyperion – Higher States Part 2 - Antibodies/Kiriakos Hadjiioannou

2015: Requiem for a piece of meat - 3art3 company, Daniel Hellmann

2013: Dark Side Of The Moon - Asphalt Piloten, Anna Anderegg

Special Dance Award 
2019: Dominique Martinoli

2017: AIEP Avventure in Elicottero Prodotti

2015: Claude Ratzé/ADC Genf

2013: Théâtre Sévelin 36

Outstanding feminine and masculine dancers 
2019: Marie-Caroline Hominal / Edouard Hue.

2017: Marthe Krummenacher / Tamara Bacci.

2015: Simone Aughterlony / Ioannis Mandafounis.

2013: Yen Han / Foofwa d’Imobilité.

References

Awards established in 2012
Dance awards
Dance in Switzerland
Contemporary dance